Robert Campbell (March 20, 1818 – June 14, 1887) was a Scottish-born Ontario businessman and political figure. He represented Renfrew South in the House of Commons of Canada from 1882 to 1887 as a Liberal member.

He was born in Glenurquhart, the son of Dugald Campbell, and came to Lochiel Township, Glengarry County, Upper Canada with his parents in 1820. Campbell entered the timber trade and was manager for John Egan on the Bonnechere River. In 1845, he married Elizabeth Lothian. He was named a justice of the peace and served on the municipal council for Eganville. He established his own lumber company with his son Robert Adam Campbell. He ran unsuccessfully for a seat in the House of Commons in 1878 before being elected in 1882. Campbell died in office in 1887.

External links 
The Canadian parliamentary companion, 1887 JA Gemmill

1818 births
1887 deaths
Liberal Party of Canada MPs
Members of the House of Commons of Canada from Ontario
Scottish emigrants to pre-Confederation Ontario
Immigrants to Upper Canada
Canadian justices of the peace